Silvio Leonard Sarría also known as Silvio Leonard Tartabull (born September 20, 1955 in Cienfuegos) is a former sprinter from Cuba.

Career 

Leonard first announced his talent when he set a new Cuban 100 metres national junior record in 1973 with a time of 10.24 s.
Leonard was successful in the 1974 Central American and Caribbean Games winning the 100 and 200 metres double.
He came to the attention of the world when he equalled the then world record for a 100 metres with a hand-timing of 9.9 s on 5 June 1975 in Ostrava, Czechoslovakia.

Leonard was three-time Pan American Games champion, 1975 100 and 1979 100/200. When winning the title in 1975 he suffered a calamity that could seem comical if it were not for the fact that the outcome for Leonard could have been even worse. Whilst celebrating his win, he fell into the moat around the track at the Estadio Olímpico Universitario in Mexico City. The injury he suffered to his back required surgery and severely hampered his preparations for the 1976 Olympics. In the race itself, Leonard defeated the Trinidadian Hasely Crawford who was to win the Olympic 100 metres title the following year.

Leonard did recover in time to compete at the 1976 Montreal Olympics but there suffered another misfortune. He cut his left leg on broken glass in the Olympic Village. The injury badly affected his running and he was eliminated in the quarter-finals.

In 1977, Leonard was at the peak of his powers. He became the second athlete to run the 100 metres in less than 10 seconds with electronic timing, running in 9.98 s on August 11 in Guadalajara (the first was 1968 Olympic champion Jim Hines), nowadays Leonard stands as the only Spanish-speaking 10-second barrier athlete. Leonard also had good speed endurance which he proved when he was the fastest in the world that year in the 200 metres with a time of 20.08 s. At the inaugural Athletics World Cup that year, Leonard won bronze in both the 100 and 200 metres whilst representing the Americas. On 13 September he set a low-altitude world best time for the 100 m at 10.03 s. He also won the 1977 100-metre Gold at the World Student Games.

In 1978 he successfully defended his double Golds in the 100/200 metres at the Central American and Caribbean Games. He also set a personal best and world's fastest time  at the 200 metres of 20.06 s on 19 June in Warsaw.

In 1979, at the second Athletics World Cup he won the 200 metres and was runner-up in the 100 metres. He was also Cuban champion and won the Soviet 100 metres championship that year.

At the 1980 Summer Olympics Leonard won a silver medal in 100 metres, finishing behind Allan Wells of Great Britain. He then went on to finish 4th in the Olympic 200 metres final in a time of 20.30, narrowly missing out on another medal.

Leonard was never a factor at world level after the 1980 season and disappointingly there has been no legacy of world-class Cuban sprinters to follow him and his 100 and 200 metres bests are still Cuban records.

He retired in 1985 and is reportedly now a track coach.

Notes

Rankings

Leonard was ranked among the best in the world in both the 100 and 200 m sprint events over the incredible spread of 8 seasons from 1973 to 1980, according to the votes of the experts of Track and Field News.

Awards 

In 2003, Leonard was inducted into the Central American and Caribbean Athletics Hall of Fame.

References

External links 
Leading Marks by Year

Cuban male sprinters
1955 births
Living people
People from Cienfuegos
Pan American Games gold medalists for Cuba
Pan American Games silver medalists for Cuba
Pan American Games medalists in athletics (track and field)
Olympic athletes of Cuba
Olympic silver medalists for Cuba
Athletes (track and field) at the 1976 Summer Olympics
Athletes (track and field) at the 1980 Summer Olympics
Athletes (track and field) at the 1975 Pan American Games
Athletes (track and field) at the 1979 Pan American Games
Athletes (track and field) at the 1983 Pan American Games
Medalists at the 1980 Summer Olympics
Olympic silver medalists in athletics (track and field)
Universiade medalists in athletics (track and field)
Central American and Caribbean Games gold medalists for Cuba
Competitors at the 1974 Central American and Caribbean Games
Competitors at the 1978 Central American and Caribbean Games
Universiade gold medalists for Cuba
Universiade silver medalists for Cuba
Central American and Caribbean Games medalists in athletics
Medalists at the 1973 Summer Universiade
Medalists at the 1977 Summer Universiade
Medalists at the 1975 Pan American Games
Medalists at the 1979 Pan American Games
Medalists at the 1983 Pan American Games
Friendship Games medalists in athletics